The Wirrbachtalbrücke is an arch bridge in Geschwenda, Thuringia, Germany. The bridge is located on the Bundesstraße 88 (Ohrdruf–Ilmenau), above the Wirrbach river of the Thuringian Forest. The construction of the bridge began in 2001, and was completed in 2003.

References

Arch bridges
Bridges completed in 2003
Road bridges in Germany